Melanognathus (Greek for "black jaw") is a genus of prehistoric lungfish which lived during the Devonian period.

References

Prehistoric lungfish genera
Devonian bony fish
Paleozoic life of the Northwest Territories